Oinousses (alternative forms: Aignousa (Αιγνούσα) or Egnousa (Εγνούσα)) is a barren cluster of 1 larger and 8 smaller islands some  off the north-east coast of the Greek island of Chios and  west of Turkey. Administratively the islands form a municipality within the Chios regional unit, which is part of the North Aegean region. The principal town of the islands and seat of the municipality is also called Oinousses. Oinousses has a small resident population, living primarily in the island's town of Oinoússes (pop. 792), and a recently built monastery.  The town is centred on a square and a small port; it includes a school, several churches, a Naval high school and a maritime museum. The only other populated settlements are Kástron (pop. 29) and Aspalathrókampos (5).

Employment
The vast majority of the workforce of the island is engaged in seafaring, fishing and goat-herding.

The islands are noted as the origin of an unusual cluster of successful ship-owning families: the Lemos, Pateras, Hadjipateras, Samonas,Kollakis and Lyras families.  Whilst most of the families now live elsewhere most of the year, the islands and town are well maintained with a strong naval connection. Oinoussians abroad are noted for their successful entrepreneurial skills in the industrial transportation industry. Although the number of Oinoussian ship operating companies has fallen since their heyday in the 1960s they still maintain a formidable position in the industrial transportation industry.

Museum
In the town, there is a beautiful and well kept museum. On display are a number of ship models, dating back as far as 1800. Some of these little boats were constructed in the Napoleonic age  by prisoners of war. (See also the guide book to the Museum of Oinousses)

The islands of the complex
The Oinousses Complex comprises the below islands. The largest is Oinousses or Egnoussa (14.3 km2), the second-largest is the islet Pasas or Panagia (2.5 km2) and the third-largest is the islet Vatos. The municipality has an area of 17.427 km2.
Oinousses or Egnoussa (Οινούσσες)
Agios Panteleimon (Άγιος Παντελεήμων)
Archontoniso (Αρχοντόνησο)
Gadros (Γάδρος)
Gaidouronisos (Γαϊδουρόνησος)
Mallaropetra (Μαλλιαρόπετρα)
Monaftis (Μονάφτης)
Nisi Panagias (Νησί Παναγιάς)
Nisi Pittas (Νησί Πίττας)
Papapondikadiko (Παπαποντικάδικο)
Pasas or Panagia (Πασάς)
Pateroniso (Πατερόνησο)
Pontikonisi (Ποντικονήσι)
Prassonisia (Πρασονήσια)
Santa Panagia (Σάντα Παναγιά)
Vatos (Βάτος)

Historical population

See also
Battle of the Oinousses Islands in 1695 between the Ottoman Empire and the Republic of Venice
List of settlements in the Chios regional unit

References

External links

Populated places in Chios (regional unit)
Mediterranean port cities and towns in Greece
Municipalities of the North Aegean
Landforms of Chios (regional unit)
Archipelagoes of Greece
Islands of the North Aegean
Natura 2000 in Greece